Steven Leath (born 1957) is an American academic administrator. He was president of Iowa State University from 2012 to 2017, when he became president of Auburn University. He resigned from his position at Auburn in 2019.

Early life and education

Leath was born in Providence, Rhode Island, moving to St. Paul, Minnesota at the age of two. Leath later moved again to central Pennsylvania, where he took up a number of sports, including hunting and fishing.

He obtained his bachelor's degree from Penn State University in 1979, studying plant science. Two years later he received his M.S. in plant pathology from the University of Delaware, and a Ph.D. in plant pathology and phytopathology from the University of Illinois at Urbana-Champaign in 1984.

Career

Prior to his position at Iowa State, Leath was vice president for research for the 16-campus University of North Carolina system.

In 2013, he established 'ISU 4 Promise.' This program commits Iowa State to pay the college tuition of disadvantaged students from local elementary schools.

A notable event that occurred during Leath's tenure at Iowa State was his decision to permanently end Veishea after 2014. This was due to continued problems with violence that occurred during the festival, especially a series of violent disturbances that led to his suspending Veishea halfway through the festival in 2014.

After five years at Iowa State, Leath was named the president of Auburn University in 2017. While he was praised for record enrollment and investment in campus infrastructure, he was also criticized for personal use of a university aircraft.

During Leath's tenure, Auburn was designated an 'R1' institution by the Carnegie Classification of Institutions of Higher Education. The designation is reserved for doctoral universities with the highest levels of research activity.

In 2018, Leath was appointed to the National Science Board.

In June 2019, he resigned from Auburn, which paid him a $4.5 million severance.

In 2021, he was named the executive director of the Council to Advance Hunting and the Shooting Sports.

Personal life

Leath and his wife have two sons, Eric and Scott.

An Instrument-rated pilot, Leath damaged a Cirrus SR-22 in 2016 owned by Iowa State while landing in gusty conditions in Bloomington, IL. The ensuing controversy about the use of school property for personal travel, and the fact that the school paid for the damage, led to Leath publicly declaring that he would no longer fly state-owned aircraft.

References

University of Delaware alumni
University of Illinois alumni
Pennsylvania State University alumni
Presidents of Iowa State University
Living people
University of North Carolina administrators
1957 births
Presidents of Auburn University